Hoeven's snake eel (Pisodonophis hoeveni) is an eel in the family Ophichthidae (worm/snake eels). It was described by Pieter Bleeker in 1853, originally under the genus Ophisurus. It is a marine, tropical eel which is known from three specimens found in the Indo-Western Pacific, including Sulawesi, Indonesia, the Persian Gulf and the Gulf of Oman. It is known to inhabit shallow water and lagoons.

References

Hoeven's snake eel
Fish of the Indian Ocean
Marine fish of Asia
Marine fauna of Western Asia
Fish of Indonesia
Fish of Iran
Fish of Western Asia
Vertebrates of the Arabian Peninsula
Fauna of Sulawesi
Hoeven's snake eel
Taxa named by Pieter Bleeker